180 Montgomery Street is a 25-story, . Class A office building in the financial district of San Francisco, California. The building serves as the corporate headquarters for Bank of the West, and has offices for other major tenants such as, Ameriprise Financial, Berlitz, Hanjin Shipping, Kforce, Valimail, Lexmark, Prudential Insurance, the Union Labor Life Insurance Company, and Western Union.

180 Montgomery is owned by a joint venture formed in 2007 between Mitsui Fudosan
America, Inc. and The Swig Company.

It sits on the site of the former Occidental Hotel which was destroyed in the 1906 earthquake.

See also
 San Francisco's tallest buildings

References

External links
180 Montgomery Street official website

Financial District, San Francisco
Office buildings completed in 1979
Skyscraper office buildings in San Francisco
Swig Company